Kenneth A. Ballhatchet (1922–1995) was a British historian and university professor.

Biography 
He was born in Bristol on 29 November 1922.

He was educated at Clifton College, Bristol. He graduated from Peterhouse College, Cambridge University.

He served as the Professor Emeritus of South Asian history at the University of London. He is also listed as a contributor to the Encyclopedia Britannica and the article on James Broun-Ramsay, 1st Marquess of Dalhousie was largely written by him.

He died on 13 March 1995. After his death a Festschrift was published in his honour by Peter Robb.

Bibliography
His notable books include:
 Race, sex, and class under the Raj : imperial attitudes and policies and their critics, 1793-1905
 Social policy and social change in western India, 1817-1830
 The City in South Asia : pre-modern and modern
 Society and ideology : essays in South Asian history
 Class, caste and Catholicism in India 1789-1914 
 Changing South Asia

References

External links 
 Festschrift

1922 births
1995 deaths

20th-century English historians
Historians of South Asia
People from Bristol
Alumni of Peterhouse, Cambridge
People educated at Clifton College
Academics of the University of London